Joseph de La Roche Daillon (died 1656, Paris) was a French Catholic missionary to the Huron Indians and a Franciscan Récollet priest. He is best remembered in Canada as an explorer and missionary, and in the United States as the discoverer of oil near the Allegany River.

He was the son of Jacques de La Roche, seigneur of Daillon in Anjou, and of Jeanne Froyer of La Baronnière. La Roche's career as a missionary lasted less than five years in the 1620s.

Arrival in Quebec and among the Hurons, 1625

La Roche arrived at Quebec City from Dieppe on June 19, 1625, to become a missionary to the Hurons.

His superiors having requested him to go and lend his assistance to Father Nicolas Viel, a missionary to the Hurons, he had already gone as far as Trois-Rivières in the company of St. Jean de Brébeuf, when he learned of Father Viel's death, which had occurred on June 25. Both Hurons and French then persuaded them to turn back.

On July 14, 1626, he set out again, and after a successful trip made in Huron canoes, he at last arrived at the village of Toanché.

Trip to Western New York & the oil discovery, 1626-1627

La Roche left the Hurons on October 18, 1626, choosing to minister to the Neutrals, so-called because they remained neutral between the Huron and Iroquois. The Neutrals lived near the modern-day sites of both Hamilton and Buffalo and along the Grand and Niagara rivers. At the time, the Neutrals had 28 villages, as reported by de la Roche.

La Roche settled on the east bank of the Niagara, north of the present site of Buffalo. He lived in the area for three months, learning the Neutral language and teaching them on Christian topics. The trip ended poorly, however. The Hurons, unhappy with the French presence, portrayed La Roche as a sorcerer, and the Neutrals nearly put him to death. He escaped west and returned to the Hurons.

La Roche was probably the first European to see Niagara Falls (or at least the second; Étienne Brûlé may have also seen them during his exploration and pass-through of the territory), although Louis Hennepin was the first to describe it. He also spent time with the Neutral Nation (the Attawandaron) south of Midland, Ontario and estimated the population as 40,000.

The next summer, in 1627, he joined a group of nomadic Indians and traveled along the course of the Genesee River to the area of present-day Cuba Lake. Local natives, the Wenrohronon or Wenro, showed him a petroleum creek, which they used for medicinal purposes. This is the first account of oil in North America.

La Roche was one of the few Europeans to reach what is now Western New York before the Seneca-led invasion of the territory that began approximately ten years after his departure.

Leaving the Hurons and Canada, 1628-1656
In 1628, he went to Trois-Rivieres with the Hurons on a trading trip. From there he journeyed to Quebec City, and was ministering there in May 1629.

When the English briefly took control of Quebec City in 1629, the Catholic missionaries were forced to leave the province. La Roche was the Latin language interpreter during the capitulation.

He left Quebec on September 9, 1629, and died in Paris in 1656.

La Roche published an account of his voyage to and sojourn among the Neutrals, describing their country and their customs, and mentioning the oil he discovered. Gabriel Sagard and Chrétien Le Clercq reproduced it in their writings, in a more or less abridged form.

Legacy

La Roche's discovery of oil makes him a notable figure in the history of Western New York and Northeastern Pennsylvania, where he's typically called De La Roche D'Aillon.  Interest in him grew after the Pennsylvania oil boom starting in 1859.

De La Roche Hall, the main science building at St. Bonaventure University, is named for the friar. Exterior details on the building have a petroleum theme in honor of his discovery.

See also
Oil Springs Reservation, the site of the oil discovery
USS Soubarissen (AO-93), a fleet oiler named for the Indian chief who met La Roche and showed him the oil springs
Cuba, New York, the nearest town

References

 "La Roche Daillon, Joseph de" in the Dictionary of Canadian Biography
 Franciscans in Canada

External links
 "Joseph de La Roche Daillon" by Odoric-M. Jouve in the Catholic Encyclopedia, 1910
 Joseph de la Roche Daillon in the Atlas of Canada
 History and exterior details of De La Roche Hall, St. Bonaventure University

Year of birth missing
1656 deaths
Recollects
French Roman Catholic missionaries
Roman Catholic missionaries in New France
Immigrants to New France